Aleksei Valeryevich Serebryakov, PAR, HOR (born 3 July 1964) is a Soviet and Russian stage and film actor. He started acting at 15, and now he is one of the most popular and highly paid Russian actors. He has appeared in Leviathan and McMafia.

Biography

Early life and career beginnings
Aleksei Valeryevich Serebryakov was born on 3 July 1964 in Moscow. His father was an aircraft engineer and his mother worked as a doctor at the Gorky Film Studio. In his childhood, he attended a music school (class of accordion). He made his debut as an actor at 13, when his music teacher published a photo of him in the newspaper Vechernyaya Moskva. Serebryakov was noticed by casting directors Valery Uskov and Vladimir Krasnopolsky, who conducted castings for the Soviet TV series Eternal Call.

In 1986, he graduated from the Lunacharsky State Institute for Theatre Arts, where he went to the acting school of Oleg Tabakov, after which he played for several years at the Moscow Theatre-Studio "Tabakerka" directed by Oleg Tabakov. In 1991, he left the theater.

After graduating from the Russian Institute of Theatre Arts, Serebryakov starred in several films, including Silent Outpost (1986) and Accused of the Wedding (1986), and some others. He gained wide popularity due to his main character as a criminal fighter in Vladimir Feoktistov's movie Fan (1989).

1990s–present
In 1990, Serebryakov appeared in Afghan Breakdown, directed by Vladimir Bortko. He also starred in the 1990 film Accidental Waltz, for which he won the best actor prize at the Locarno Film Festival. In 1994, he appeared in the Sergey Livnov drama Hammer and Sickle.

Later in the decade, he also appeared in numerous TV series, including Bandit Petersburg, Empire Under Attack, The White Guard and many others. Concurrently, he starred in the movies "Antikiller 2: Antiterror" and "Escape" by Yegor Konchalovsky, Dead Man's Bluff by Aleksei Balabanov, The 9th Company and Dark Planet by Fyodor Bondarchuk, Vadim Shmelev's The Apocalypse Code, Gloss by Andrei Konchalovsky, "Golden Section" by Sergei Debizhev, Once Upon a Time There Lived a Simple Woman by Andrei Smirnov, "Solo on the Saxophone" by Alexander Kirienko and the fantasy-anthology film Fairytale.Is.

He performed in Lenkom Theatre between 2009 and 2012. He played Sergei Mamontov in the partly biographical film The PyraMMMid (2011), a fictional story inspired by financier Sergei Mavrodi (the founder of MMM pyramid scheme). In 2014, Serebryakov played the lead role of Kolya in Andrey Zvyagintsev's internationally acclaimed drama Leviathan. After that, Serebryakov appeared in Sergei Puskepalis's directorial debut, Clinch.

In 2015–2016, he continued acting in TV series, including Fartsa and The Method. In 2017, he played role of Dr. Andrey Richter in Doctor Richter, a Russian remake of the American medical drama series, House. In the same year, he appeared in the historical fantasy feature film Furious. Serebryakov appeared in the 2018 BBC series McMafia, where he played Dimitri Godman, mafia boss father of protagonist Alex.

Political views
In 2018, Serebryakov became embroiled in controversy over his statement in an interview that the most common traits of Russian people are "[brutal] force, rudeness and arrogance". He also said in the interview that he does not like two things about Vladimir Putin: lies and thieving. At a business forum in London later that year, he accused Russia of stirring up multiple wars.

Personal life
Serebryakov has been in a relationship with his wife Maria since the 1980s. They were married in the 1990s and have three children; one child from Maria's previous marriage and two whom they have adopted together. In March 2012, Serebryakov emigrated to Canada with his family, citing corruption and political unrest in Russia as barriers to raising his children. He later stated that he held no Canadian citizenship, but it was cheaper for him to live there. In 2021 it was reported that Serebryakov had returned back to Russia. According to the actor, "As a matter of fact, I never left, I only took my children away for studying".

Awards

1990: Locarno Film Festival – Best Actor Award (Accidental Waltz)
1993: Sozvezdie International Film Festival, Russia – special jury prize (Higher measure)
1994: Kinoshock Film Festival – best male role (Hammer and Sickle)
2000: Festival "Vivat, Cinema of Russia!" (St. Petersburg) – prize for the best male role (Tests for Real Men)
2006: Festival "Vivat, Cinema of Russia!" (St. Petersburg) – prize for the best role (Vanyukhin's Children)
2014: IFFI Best Actor Award (Male) at 45th International Film Festival of India – (Leviathan)
2019: Nika Award for Best Actor (Van Goghs)

Filmography

References

External links

Aleksei Serebryakov on KinoPoisk

1964 births
20th-century Russian male actors
21st-century Russian male actors
Living people
Male actors from Moscow
Russian Academy of Theatre Arts alumni
Honored Artists of the Russian Federation
People's Artists of Russia
Recipients of the Nika Award
IFFI Best Actor (Male) winners
Russian expatriates in Canada
Russian male child actors
Russian male film actors
Russian male stage actors
Russian male television actors
Russian male voice actors
Soviet male child actors
Soviet male film actors
Soviet male stage actors
Soviet male television actors
Soviet male voice actors
Russian activists against the 2022 Russian invasion of Ukraine